The Al-Thawawda or Al-Thawadi is an Arab tribe in the Arab States of the Arabian Gulf, particularly Bahrain, Qatar, and Saudi Arabia. The Al Thawawda are a sub-clan of the Bani Khalid tribe, originally formed in Bahrain and Saudi Arabia only. (Not originally Qatari, rather Bahraini or Saudi)

In Bahrain, the family is based in Al Hidd and Muharraq. Many family members were involved in the lucrative pearl hunting industry.

The Al Thawawda are among those clans that moved to Bahrain from Zubara following the 1783 Bani Utbah invasion of Bahrain.

Among the famous members of the family are leftist political activist Ahmad Al-Thawadi, and the founder of the Housing Bank, Isa Bin Sultan Al Thawadi, and CEO of the Qatar 2022 World Cup Bid Hassan Bin Abdulla Al Thawadi.

External links
Al Thawawda family discussion forum
الذواودة ينتسبون إلى العمائر من قبيلة بني خالد, Al Waqt, 16 October 2009
تصحيحات واستدراك في ترجمة الشيخ عبدالله بن عيسى الذوادي, Al Waqt, 20 November 2009

Tribes of Arabia
Tribes of Saudi Arabia
Bedouin groups
Bahraini families